The Majesty of the Law is a 1915 American drama silent film written and directed by Julia Crawford Ivers. The film stars George Fawcett (in his film debut), Jane Wolfe, William Desmond, Myrtle Stedman, John Oaker, and Charlie Ruggles. The film was released on August 26, 1915, by Paramount Pictures.

Plot

Cast 
George Fawcett as Judge Randolph Kent
Jane Wolfe as Mrs. Kent
William Desmond as Jackson Morgan Kent
Myrtle Stedman as Virginia Fairfax
John Oaker as Lloyd Fairfax
Charlie Ruggles as Lawrence Evans
Herbert Standing as Colonel Monroe

Preservation
The film survives and is preserved complete in the Library of Congress.

References

External links 
 

1915 films
1910s English-language films
Silent American drama films
1915 drama films
Paramount Pictures films
American black-and-white films
American silent feature films
Films directed by Julia Crawford Ivers
1910s American films
English-language drama films